Chizhou Jiuhuashan Airport  is an airport serving the city of Chizhou in Anhui Province, China.  It is located in Guichi District, 20 kilometers from the city center.  The airport also serves the city of Tongling and the Buddhist sacred mountain of Jiuhuashan, both 20 kilometers away.  Construction of the airport began on 26 August 2009.  It was originally expected to cost 609 million yuan and to open in 2011, but the actual opening date was 29 July 2013, with a total cost of 889 million yuan.

Facilities
The airport has a runway that is 2,400 meters long and 45 meters wide.  It is designed to handle 500,000 passengers per year.

Airlines and destinations

See also
List of airports in China
List of the busiest airports in China

References

Airports in Anhui
Airports established in 2013
2013 establishments in China
Buildings and structures in Chizhou